Lake Travis is a reservoir on the Colorado River in central Texas in the United States.

Serving principally as a flood-control reservoir, Lake Travis' historical minimum to maximum water height change is nearly 100 feet. For example, following the 2018 Llano River flood (the Llano River feeds into the Colorado River), Lake Travis saw a 20-foot depth increase within a single 24-hour period of time. With 30 square miles of surface area, Lake Travis has the largest storage capacity of the seven reservoirs known as the Highland Lakes, and stretches 65 miles (105 km) upriver from western Travis County (near Lago Vista, Texas) in a highly serpentine course into southern Burnet County to Max Starcke Dam, southwest of the town of Marble Falls. Besides being used for flood control and as a water supply, the lake is also used for electrical power generation and recreation.

The Pedernales River, a major tributary of the Colorado River, flows into the lake from southwestern Travis County.

History

Creation 
The reservoir was formed in 1942 by the construction of Mansfield Dam on the western edge of Austin, Texas by the Lower Colorado River Authority (LCRA), and was built specifically to contain floodwaters in a flash-flood prone region. During its construction, after a severe flood in July 1938, the height of the dam was raised to add storage capacity for floodwaters.

Ferry service 
Regularly scheduled ferry service between Point Venture and the south side of Hurst Creek began in April 1971, operated by Point Venture Development Co. The trip took 20 minutes and was the only inland ferry service in Texas at the time.

September 2020 boat sinkings 
On September 5, 2020, a boat parade took place in support of Donald Trump. The Travis County Sheriff's office reported that they had received multiple calls involving boats in distress, and that several boats had sunk. The weather was calm, but the boats generated significant wake as they began to move together, which subsequently sank at least five boats. The hashtag #dumbkirk trended on Twitter following the incident.

Recreational uses

Lake Travis is well known for its outdoor recreation opportunities, including fishing, boating, swimming, scuba diving, picnicking, camping, and zip lining. Another recreational use, nude sunbathing and swimming, is permitted in Hippie Hollow Park. This picturesque park is located near the eastern end of Lake Travis and is the only legal clothing optional park in Texas. Lake Travis is generally considered one of the clearest lakes in Texas. It is a vital water supply for the nearby city of Austin, Texas and the surrounding metropolitan area.

Fatality rankings
In ranking lakes in Texas for accidental fatalities, Lake Travis was in first-place in 2011 and tied for second-place for total deaths over the years 2000–2015.

Six people drowned in Lake Travis in 2018, out of 29 total boating deaths reported across Texas that year.

Fish populations 
Lake Travis has been stocked with several species of fish intended to improve the utility of the reservoir for recreational fishing. Fish present in Lake Travis include largemouth bass, guadalupe bass, white bass, striped bass, catfish and sunfish.

In spring 2008 there were several reports of leeches residing in Lake Travis. The leeches are generally harmless to humans but can be a nuisance.

Lake levels

Above , flood control gates at Mansfield Dam are opened under the direction of the U.S. Army Corps of Engineers.

The level of the lake can vary dramatically—with an over 96-foot range between its historical high and low—depending on the amount of rainfall in the Colorado River basin upstream.

Droughts
During the 2010–13 Southern United States drought, levels went as low as 618 feet, making it the third lowest level ever. The LCRA, a public utility whose responsibilities include the management of Lake Travis, makes water level reports available on the internet. In April 2016, the lake returned to its full capacity at 681 ft.

Floods
Lake Travis serves as the primary flood control reservoir of the Highland Lake chain. The LCRA, under advisement from the U.S. Army Corps of Engineers, is responsible for floodgate operations at Mansfield Dam. Ideally, this is done in a time-delayed fashion after a major rainfall so as to either mitigate or outright prevent downstream flooding which otherwise would have been both immediate and extreme without the dam's presence. As Lake Travis levels increase during major floods, floodgate operations are conducted to protect property around Lake Travis as well as the dam itself.

While the dam's physical design assists in its own protection during floods, extensive spillway operations, a worst-case scenario which has not happened in the lake's history, could undermine the dam's base and affect its overall integrity. Under such conditions, operations are primarily intended to protect the dam, and lake water may be released to the dam's full, 24-floodgate capacity—regardless of downstream effects—to prevent the catastrophic loss of the dam. Including its hydroelectric generators but not the spillway, at 681 feet above msl the dam's total maximum discharge capacity is more than 130,000 cubic feet per second (cfs); a bit under one million gallons per second. Rates of discharge increase as water levels/pressures increase.

See also 
 Pedernales River
 Lake Travis High School

References

External links 

  Key Water Levels for Lake Travis During Floods
 
 
 

1942 establishments in Texas
Protected areas of Burnet County, Texas
Geography of Austin, Texas
Reservoirs in Texas
Protected areas of Travis County, Texas
Bodies of water of Burnet County, Texas
Bodies of water of Travis County, Texas
Lower Colorado River Authority